União Desportiva Sousense (abbreviated as UD Sousense) is a Portuguese football club based in Foz de Sousa, Gondomar in the district of Porto.

Background
UD Sousense currently plays in the Campeonato de Portugal which is the third tier of Portuguese football. The club was founded on 1 December 1937 and they play their home matches at the Estádio 1º de Dezembro in Foz de Sousa, Gondomar. The stadium is able to accommodate 10,000 spectators. Sousense played for the first 70 years of existence in the regional leagues of Porto. In the 2009–10 season, the club won the championship, thus gaining promotion to the fourth level for the first time.

The club is affiliated to Associação de Futebol do Porto and has competed in the AF Porto Taça. The club has also entered the national cup competition known as Taça de Portugal on a few occasions.

Current squad

Season to season

Honours
AF Porto Divisão de Honra: 2009/10

See also
Apito Dourado

Footnotes

External links
Official website 

Football clubs in Portugal
Association football clubs established in 1937
1937 establishments in Portugal